Paukkaungia is a genus of adapiform primate that lived in Asia during the Eocene.

References

Literature cited

 

Prehistoric strepsirrhines
Eocene mammals of Asia
Fossil taxa described in 2007
Eocene primates
Prehistoric primate genera